James Storme (born 12 April 1943) is a Belgian former football player and manager who played as a midfielder.

References

1943 births
Living people
Belgian footballers
Association football midfielders
K.A.A. Gent players
Standard Liège players
Royale Union Saint-Gilloise players
K.V. Oostende players
Belgian Pro League players
Belgian football managers
K.V. Oostende managers
K.V. Kortrijk managers
K.S.C. Lokeren Oost-Vlaanderen managers
Beerschot A.C. managers
R.A.E.C. Mons managers
K.S.V. Roeselare managers
K.R.C. Gent managers